"Neuköln" is an instrumental piece written by David Bowie and Brian Eno in 1977 for the album "Heroes". It was the last of three consecutive instrumentals on side two of the original vinyl album, following "Sense of Doubt" and "Moss Garden."

Neukölln (correctly spelled with a double "L") is a district of Berlin. Bowie lived in Berlin for a time in 1977, although not in Neukölln but in Schöneberg. The music has been interpreted as reflecting in part the rootlessness of the Turkish immigrants who made up a large proportion of the area's population. Edgar Froese, founder of Tangerine Dream, was also from southern Neukölln. Froese's album Epsilon in Malaysian Pale, mostly played with Mellotron (just like Neuköln), was according to Bowie a big influence and a "soundtrack to his life in Berlin".

NME journalists Roy Carr and Charles Shaar Murray described "Neuköln" as "a mood piece: the Cold War viewed through a bubble of blood or Harry Lime's last thoughts as he dies in the sewer in The Third Man. The final section features Bowie's plaintive saxophone "booming out across a harbour of solitude, as if lost in fog."

The main character Christiane from the film Christiane F. – We Children from Bahnhof Zoo, starring David Bowie as himself, is also from southern Neukölln. Bowie produced the Christiane F. soundtrack which gave the film a commercial boost.

Dylan Howe covered the piece for his album Subterranean – New Designs on Bowie's Berlin in 2014, in two parts, part one is called "Neukölln - Night" and part two "Neukölln - Day."

Cover versions
 Philip Glass – "Heroes" Symphony (1996)
 Dylan Howe – Subterranean – New Designs on Bowie's Berlin (2014)
 Shearwater – as part of a live performance of the entire Berlin Trilogy for WNYC (2018)

Notes

David Bowie songs
1977 songs
Rock instrumentals
Songs written by David Bowie
Songs written by Brian Eno
Song recordings produced by David Bowie
Song recordings produced by Tony Visconti